"Popscene" is a song by English alternative rock band Blur, released as a non-album single on 30 March 1992. Despite its relatively low chart placing, it has since become critically praised and regarded as one of the pioneering songs of the Britpop genre.

Recording
The song was first played live in late 1991, and recorded at Matrix Studios in Holborn with producer Steve Lovell. The lyrics showed frontman Damon Albarn's distaste for the music business, complaining that there were too many insignificant indie bands.

Musically, it was different to the style seen on the group's first album Leisure and featured heavily flanged guitars, a Can influenced drumbeat, and brass from session players the Kick Horns. The band considered "Popscene" to be the loudest and best thing they had worked on at that point.

Reception
The single reached No. 32 on the UK Singles Chart, and was panned by both Melody Maker and NME. The Beastie Boys, guest reviewing for NME, suggested the record would sound better played at 33rpm instead of 45. The low chart placing came as a confidence blow for the band, who were £60,000 in debt. Food Records boss Andy Ross later said "we were totally devastated ... we thought it was a brilliant single." The band have since said that the popularity of American grunge music contributed to the single's failure, as they felt the song had a very British feel. Guitarist Graham Coxon said "It was Nirvana that really fucked "Popscene" up."

Sylvia Patterson from Smash Hits rated the song two out of five. She wrote: "[The song] starts off like the Inspiral Carpets in a car crash and ends up exactly like Mancunian punk-poppers from yesteryear The Buzzcocks. A bizarre commotion from hell. Not very good either."

The experience of recording "Popscene" led the band to believe they should simply play music in their own style and not worry about trends. The "Britishness" of "Popscene" carried over to the group's second album, Modern Life Is Rubbish. The song was not released on the British version of the album, though it was added as an extra track in the United States. In Australia, "Popscene" was not released until 1998, when it was issued as a double A-side with "On Your Own"; it reached No. 69 on the ARIA Singles Chart.

The song has since become a fan favourite and is still performed live.  Retrospective critical reaction to "Popscene" has been positive. Jonathan Holden, writing in the Rough Guide To Rock, declared the single to be "excellent" and that its "punky, energetic and brass-fulfilled pop" was out of place in 1992. John Harris considers the track as one of the first ever Britpop songs, and a starting point for the movement. The song had never been included on a UK Blur album, until 2009 when it was released on the compilation Midlife: A Beginner's Guide to Blur.

Track listings
All songs were written by Albarn, Coxon, James and Rowntree.

7-inch and cassette
 "Popscene" – 3:12
 "Mace" – 3:24

12-inch
 "Popscene" – 3:12
 "I'm Fine" – 3:01
 "Mace" – 3:24
 "Garden Central" – 5:58

CD
 "Popscene" – 3:12
 "Mace" – 3:24
 "Badgeman Brown" – 4:47

Production credits
 "Popscene" produced by Steve Lovell
 "Mace", "Badgeman Brown",  and "Garden Central" produced by Blur and John Smith
 "I'm Fine" 'produced by Blur
 Damon Albarn: lead vocals, synthesizers
 Graham Coxon: guitars, backing vocals
 Alex James: bass guitar
 Dave Rowntree: drums
 The Kick Horns: brass

Charts

References

Bibliography

 
 
 

1992 singles
1998 singles
Blur (band) songs
Songs about pop music
Songs written by Damon Albarn
Songs written by Graham Coxon
Songs written by Alex James (musician)
Songs written by Dave Rowntree
1992 songs
Food Records singles